Korani-ye Olya (also Romanized as Korānī-ye ‘Olyā, Korānī-e ‘Olyā, and Korrānī-ye ‘Olyā; also known as Korānī-ye Bālā, Korrānī, and Kūrānī) is a village in Dorudfaraman Rural District, in the Central District of Kermanshah County, Kermanshah Province, Iran. At the 2006 census, its population was 184, in 40 families.

References 

Populated places in Kermanshah County